Fusipala may refer to:

ʻElisiva Fusipala Taukiʻonetuku (1850–1889), granddaughter of George Tupou II and mother of George Tupou II
ʻElisiva Fusipala Taukiʻonetuku (1912–1933), daughter of George Tupou II 
ʻElisiva Fusipala Vahaʻi (1949–2014), granddaughter of Sālote Tupou III